Bogorodskoye Airport  is an airport serving the village of Bogorodskoye, Khabarovsk Krai. Two airlines, Aurora and KhabAvia, fly to the airport.

Airlines and destinations 

As of January 2016, Aurora flies once a week to Yuzhno-Sakhalinsk via Nogliki using Dash 8-300 aircraft, and KhabAvia operates once-a-week flights to Khabarovsk during the fall and winter.

See also
 
 
 List of airports in Russia

References 

Airports in Khabarovsk Krai